ITC Benguiat is a decorative serif typeface designed by Ed Benguiat and released by the International Typeface Corporation (ITC) in 1977. The face is loosely based upon typefaces of the Art Nouveau period but is not considered an academic revival. The face follows ITC's design formulary of an extremely high x-height, combined with multiple widths and weights.

The original version of 1977 contained numerous nonstandard ligatures (such as AB, AE, AH, AK, AR, LA, SS, TT) and alternate shapes for some letters which were not carried into the digital version.

The font family consists of 3 weights at 2 widths each, with complementary italic.

It is also sold as 'Formal 832' by Bitstream.

ITC Benguiat Pro
It is a version released in September 2008. It includes support for Central European and many Eastern European characters.

ITC Benguiat Gothic

ITC Benguiat Gothic is a sans-serif variant for the original serif font family. Both faces are loosely based upon typefaces of the Art Nouveau period but are not considered academic revivals. The face follows ITC's design formulary of an extremely high x-height, combined with multiple widths and weights.

The font family consists of 4 weights at 1 width each, with complementary italic.

It is also sold as 'Informal 851' by Bitstream.

Use in popular culture

In the 1980s, it was the house font for album cover text at RCA Records.

The font is used on the cover of 1980s Stephen King novels, The Smiths album Strangeways, Here We Come, for the book covers of the Choose Your Own Adventure series, The Bitmap Brothers game The Chaos Engine, as well as in the logos of both the National Assembly of Quebec and the Melbourne Knights. The typeface is featured in the main titles of the Star Trek films, Star Trek Generations and Star Trek: First Contact, as well as video game Nier: Automata. Paramount's FBI warning, from 1995–present, also uses ITC Benguiat. The font is also used in the logo of the American rock band Greta Van Fleet, in the logo for Netflix show Stranger Things, and in the album art for rapper  Logic's album  Supermarket.
The font is used for the logo written and directed by Quentin Tarantino in the beginning of his films.

ITC Benguiat Gothic is also featured in The Sims 2 PC video game.

See also
 Korinna, a similarly styled typeface by Berthold

References

 Lawrence W Wallis. Modern Encyclopedia of Typefaces 1960–90. Lund Humphries Publishers Ltd: 2000. .
 Friedl, Frederich, Nicholas Ott and Bernard Stein. Typography: An Encyclopedic Survey of Type Design and Techniques Through History. Black Dog & Leventhal: 1998. .
 Macmillan, Neil. An A–Z of Type Designers. Yale University Press: 2006. .

External links

 ITC Benguiat
 Benguat Gothic display

Serif typefaces
Sans-serif typefaces
International Typeface Corporation typefaces
Photocomposition typefaces
Digital typefaces
Art Nouveau typefaces
Typefaces and fonts introduced in 1978
Typefaces and fonts introduced in 1979
Typefaces designed by Ed Benguiat
Display typefaces